Leonardo Silva may refer to:

 Leonardo Silva (footballer, born 1979), Brazilian football centre-back
 Leonardo Silva (footballer, born 1980), Brazilian football striker
 Leonardo da Silva (footballer) (born 1987), Brazilian football forward